Monte Verde, also known as Omnium Hill, is a historic plantation house located at Center Cross, Essex County, Virginia United States. It was built about 1815, and is a two-story, frame dwelling clad in weatherboard.  It has two one-story wings added in 1958. The interior features original Federal style woodwork.

It was listed on the National Register of Historic Places in 2002.

References

External links
Mount Verde, State Route 660, Center Cross, Essex County, VA: 2 photos at Historic American Buildings Survey

Historic American Buildings Survey in Virginia
Plantation houses in Virginia
Houses on the National Register of Historic Places in Virginia
Federal architecture in Virginia
Houses completed in 1815
Houses in Essex County, Virginia
National Register of Historic Places in Essex County, Virginia